Count Nikolay Nikolayevich Novosiltsev (Novoselcev) (1761–1838) was a Russian statesman and a close aide to Alexander I of Russia.

Life

He was a natural son of a wealthy nobleman, married to the aunt of Count Pavel Stroganov. This relationship secured for him a place in the Privy Committee that outlined the Government reform of Alexander I. He drafted a constitution for the Russian empire that mirrored the constitution suggested by Speransky; unlike Speransky's, Novosiltsev's constitutional suggestion had been accepted by Alexander but the plan was abandoned after Alexander's death in 1825.

In 1804 to 1805, Sweden, Russia, England, Austria, Prussia and the Kingdom of Naples planned to form a coalition against Bonaparte's France. Alexander I sent Novosiltsev to mediate in the negotiations between England and France after Napoleon made a peace offering to England when he learned of the anti-Gallic coalition. Before leaving Berlin, Novosiltsev learned that Bonaparte had taken both Genoa and Lucca, and notified Alexander, ending the mediation towards peace in 1805.

From 1813 to 1815 he governed the finances of the occupied Duchy of Warsaw and between 1815 and 1830 he served in the government of the Congress Kingdom of Poland. In the Kingdom of Poland, he was the tsar's commissar at the Council of State. He was very influential, widely feared, and one of the de facto rulers of the country. He organized and led the Russian secret police there (okhrana). He was responsible for arrests of student activists in the Philomaths and Filaret Association in 1823. From 1824, he was curator of Vilna Governorate's education and science. He was a supporter of Russification policies, persecuted many pro-Polish organizations and activists, and was detested by contemporary Polish society.

He concluded his career as the Chairman of the Cabinet of Ministers. Nicholas I made him a count in 1835.

References

1761 births
1836 deaths
Russian nobility
Politicians of the Russian Empire
Members of the State Council (Russian Empire)
Members of the Russian Academy
Honorary members of the Saint Petersburg Academy of Sciences
Government officials of Congress Poland
Russian people of the Kościuszko Uprising
Burials at the Dukhovskaya Church